Maynard v. Cartwright, 486 U.S. 356 (1988), is a United States Supreme Court case in which a unanimous Court found that the "especially heinous, atrocious or cruel" standard for the application of the death penalty as defined by the Eighth Amendment was too vague. As such, Oklahoma's law was overturned based on Furman v. Georgia (1972).

Justice Brennan announced in a concurrence, joined by Justice Marshall, that he would adhere to his view that the death penalty is in all circumstances cruel and unusual punishment prohibited by the Eighth and Fourteenth Amendments.

See also
 Capital punishment
 Eighth Amendment to the United States Constitution
 Walton v. Arizona (1990)
 List of United States Supreme Court cases, volume 486
 List of United States Supreme Court cases
 Lists of United States Supreme Court cases by volume
 List of United States Supreme Court cases by the Rehnquist Court

References

External links
 

United States Supreme Court cases
United States Supreme Court cases of the Rehnquist Court
Cruel and Unusual Punishment Clause and death penalty case law
1988 in United States case law
Capital punishment in Oklahoma